Honey Harvester is a 1949 animated short film featuring Donald Duck.  It was released by Walt Disney Productions.

Plot
Donald Duck works in a greenhouse and notices a bee harvesting nectar. He undertakes a search to find the hive, which he finds in the radiator of his old car. He empties the hive of the honey and starts to leave, but the bee begins to attack. A struggle ensues, and Donald returns the honey...except for one jar.  This causes the bee to mount another attack.

Voice cast
Clarence Nash as Donald Duck

Home media
The short was released on December 11, 2007 on Walt Disney Treasures: The Chronological Donald, Volume Three: 1947-1950.

References

External links
 
 

1949 films
1949 animated films
1940s Disney animated short films
Donald Duck short films
Films produced by Walt Disney
Films scored by Oliver Wallace